Naha is an isolated village in the Mexican state of Chiapas, and its forest area is the federally-recognized Nahá Flora and Fauna Protection Area. Naha's Mayan indigenous people are some of the few remaining speakers of the endangered Lacandon language.

Sources
 The Endangered Lacandon Language, University of Victoria
 Mexico's CONANP list of Protected Flora & Fauna Areas (Spanish)

Populated places in Chiapas